Paskau may refer to:

 PASKAU, a special forces unit of the Royal Malaysian Air Force
 the town of Paskov in the Czech Republic